Breath of Hate is a 2011 horror film later re-released in 2015 under the title The Last House by Wild Eye Releasing. Starring Jason Mewes, Ezra Buzzington, and Monique Parent, it is the second collaboration between Velvet Hammer Films and ArsonCuff Entertainment who previously teamed up on Silent Night, Zombie Night.

Plot
Love is a prostitute looking to get out of the business, but unfortunately her last gig is for three psychotic cultists who've just escaped from a mental hospital and are trawling for victims.

Cast
 Ezra Buzzington as Hate
 Jason Mewes as Ned
 Lauren Walsh as Love
 Jack Forcinito as Sonny
 Monique Parent as Selma
 Timothy Muskatell as "Poot"
 Ricardo Gray as Cleb
 Felissa Rose as Realtor
 Alexis Zibolis as Jenna
 Jeanine Daniels as Hailey
 Trista Robinson as Tabbi
 Ted Prior as Danton
 Aramis Sartorio as Mike
 Joanna Angel as Candy
 Regan Reece as Lead Dancer

Production

Production began in August 2010 for fourteen days in the Los Angeles area. The Malibu mansion that Hate and his cohorts take over has been used in many other productions, mostly notably David DeCoteau's 1313 films and sex comedies from The Asylum.

Release
Breath of Hate had a sneak preview at the Gorezone magazine Weekend of Horrors on October 2, 2010, in London, where it played to a packed house. The film had its official world premiere as part of 2011's Another Hole in the Head film festival in San Francisco, and as part of the Fangoria film festival in Indiana.

In January 2011, Sean Cain, the film's director, stated his goal was to secure a limited theatrical run for the film. After nearly two years of talks with distributors, he started a Kickstarter campaign to obtain funds for a January 2013 four wall theatrical debut and DVD/Blu-ray release. The $15,000 fundraiser raised $5,033 after one month, and the project subsequently failed to get funded. The film was picked up for a Los Angeles premiere in March by the CineMayhem film festival in conjunction with Dread Central, as part of their 2013 Indie Horror month, where it played alongside another Jason Mewes film, K-11, and the world premiere of The ABCs of Death.

On November 24, 2015, the film, now retitled The Last House, was released digitally and on DVD through the boutique indie distributor, Wild Eye Releasing. In April 2018, it was pulled from Amazon Prime due to offensive content.

References

External links
 
 
 

2011 horror films
American horror films
American independent films
Films about cults
2010s English-language films
2010s American films